K-1 The Arena Fighters, known in Japan as Fighting Illusion 〜K-1 GRAND PRIX〜, is a video game developed by Japanese studio Daft Co. and published by Xing Entertainment and THQ for the PlayStation in 1996-1997.

Reception

The game received mixed reviews. Next Generation said, "While the developers should be given credit for trying to add realism to a fighting genre, the implementation of the actual game mechanics is another story entirely. Plagued by an annoyingly slow response, K-1 ends up being an exercise in frustration. For all practical purposes, players are limited to just one or two punches or kicks, which sacrifices gameplay for realism and quickly grows quite tiresome." In Japan, Famitsu gave it a score of 25 out of 40.

Notes

References

External links
 

1996 video games
Cancelled Sega Saturn games
K-1
Martial arts video games
Multiplayer and single-player video games
PlayStation (console) games
PlayStation (console)-only games
THQ games
Video games developed in Japan
Xing Entertainment games